Nannasaddie (fl. 1872–1875) was an Apache Indian scout in the U.S. Army who served under Lieutenant Colonel George Crook during the Apache Wars. He guided cavalry troopers against renegade Apaches in the Arizona Territory during Crook's winter campaign of 1872–73 and was one of ten scouts who later received the Medal of Honor for gallantry.

Biography
Born in the Arizona Territory, Nannasaddie was among the ten Apaches hired by the U.S. Army as an Indian scout for Lieutenant Colonel George Crook's expedition against renegades active in Arizona following the surrender of Cochise in late 1872. He guided cavalry troopers in the Tonto Basin, where the Western Apache and Yavapais raiding parties had eluded the U.S. Army for several years, fighting the Apache in the mountains during Crook's winter campaign of 1872–73. A total of 23 men received the Medal of Honor. All of the Indian scouts, including Nannasaddie, received the award on April 12, 1875, for "gallant conduct during campaigns and engagements with Apaches". The other scouts included William Alchesay, Blanquet, Chiquito, Elsatsoosu, Jim, Kelsay, Kosoha, Machol and Nantaje.

Medal of Honor citation
Rank and organization: Indian Scouts. Place and date: 1872–73. Entered service at:------. Birth: Arizona. Date of issue: 12 April 1875.

Citation:

Gallant conduct during campaigns and engagements with Apaches.

See also

 List of Medal of Honor recipients for the Indian Wars

References

Further reading
 Hirschfelder, Arlene B. and Martha Kreipe De Montaño. The Native American Almanac: A Portrait of Native America Today. New York: Prentice Hall, 1993. 
 Konstantin, Phil. This Day in North American Indian History: Important Dates in the History of North America's Native Peoples for Every Calendar Day. New York: Da Capo Press, 2002.

External links
 

Apache people
Native American people of the Indian Wars
Native American United States military personnel
United States Army Medal of Honor recipients
Military personnel from Arizona
United States Army soldiers
19th-century Native Americans
United States Army Indian Scouts
American Indian Wars recipients of the Medal of Honor
Native American people from Arizona